Borduas is a provincial electoral district in the Montérégie region of Quebec, Canada that elects members to the National Assembly of Quebec. It notably includes the municipality of Beloeil, Mont-Saint-Hilaire and Otterburn Park.

It was created for the 1994 election from Verchères and Iberville.

In the change from the 2001 to the 2011 electoral map, it gained Saint-Antoine-sur-Richelieu, Saint-Charles-sur-Richelieu, Saint-Denis-sur-Richelieu, Sainte-Madeleine, Saint-Marc-sur-Richelieu, and Sainte-Marie-Madeleine from the Verchères electoral district.

In the 1995 Quebec referendum it voted 58% for Quebec independence.

Members of the National Assembly

Election results

^ Change is from redistributed results. CAQ change is from ADQ. 

|-
 
|Liberal
|Daniel Doucet
|align="right"|9,981
|align="right"|33.76
|align="right"|+3.43

|-

|}

|-
 
|Liberal
|Yves Hennekens 
|align="right"|9,186
|align="right"|30.33
|align="right"|-8.14

|-
 
|Socialist Democracy
|Sylvie Laperle
|align="right"|274
|align="right"|0.90
|align="right"|–
|}

|-
 
|Liberal
|Laurier Thibault
|align="right"|10,651
|align="right"|38.47
|-

|Independent
|Stéphane Desmarteau
|align="right"|1,037
|align="right"|3.75
|-

|Sovereignty
|Danielle Gendron
|align="right"|537
|align="right"|1.94
|}

References

External links
Information
 Elections Quebec

Election results
 Election results (National Assembly)
 Election results (QuébecPolitique)

Referendums
 Référendum du 30 octobre 1995 (Elections Quebec)

Maps
 2011 map (PDF)
 2001 map (Flash)
2001–2011 changes (Flash)
1992–2001 changes (Flash)
 Electoral map of Montérégie region
 Quebec electoral map, 2011

Quebec provincial electoral districts